Bob McCaslin may refer to:

 Bob McCaslin Sr. (1926–2011), American politician
 Bob McCaslin Jr. (born 1957), American politician